is a Japanese manga series written and illustrated by Hajime Kōmoto. It has been serialized in Shueisha's Weekly Shōnen Jump magazine since January 2020, with its chapters collected in fifteen tankōbon volumes as of February 2023. An anime television series adaptation by A-1 Pictures is set to premiere in April 2023.

Plot
Set in a magical world in which an individual's position within society are defined by the power and skill with magic, Mash Burnedead is a young man without so much as an ounce of magic in his blood. Despite having no magic whatsoever, Mash goes to the magic school, determined to survive and show the world that muscles can beat magic.

Characters

Main characters

A young man born without magic, but makes up for it with incredible physical abilities that seem to defy logic. He loves cream puffs and is often seen eating them. Despite his blunt personality and permanently deadpan expression, Mash is a very kind and selfless person. He has a unique fighting style he dubs "Muscle Magic", which uses his physical power to perform unpredictable moves, and carries an Iron Wand which he can forcibly shape into various sports equipment.

Mash's roommate in the academy. He usually plays the straight man to the other characters' antics. His older brother is Rayne Ames, a current Divine Visionary. His personal magic allows him to swap the positions of objects.

Mash's true rival. After his sister caught a disease that'll deplete her magic, he vowed to become a Divine Visionary so she would not be killed by the law of the country. He is most notable character quirk is his sister complex and is deathly afraid of bugs and ghosts. His personal magic allows him to manipulate gravity.

Mash's self-proclaimed rival. Dot is an extremely hot-blooded and easily irritated person with a superiority complex, but is actually a good person at heart. He has a cross on his forehead that increases his magic power. His personal magic allows him to generate explosions.

Mash's self-proclaimed fiancé. Lemon comes from a poor family and came to Easton Magic Academy in order to help them. She fell in love with Mash after he assisted her during a test and misunderstood his words of reassurance for a proposal. Lemon is a soft-spoken and somewhat kooky girl.

Adler House

Rayne is the newest of the Divine Visionaries and the older brother of Finn. He has a serious personality, but he has a soft spot for bunnies, cares for Finn and Mash, and is rather gullible. His personal magic allows him to create and manipulate swords. His title as a Visionary is "The Sword Cane".

Tom is a senior at the Alder House and a member of the Duelo team. Similar to Dot, he is a very hot-blooded person, but is a lot more friendly and energetic if a bit more dense than him. One of Tom's most defining character quirks is his odd habit of comparing people to bamboo.

Max is a senior at Alder House and a Divine Visionary candidate. He is good friends with Rayne as he joined the Divine Visionary Exams in order to protect his juniors, whom he cares a lot for. His personal magic allows him to manipulate the size of objects.

Lang House

The prefect of Lang House and the leader of the Magia Lupus. Abel is a noble who believes that all humans, including himself, are mere beasts who need to be controlled. He also possesses a hatred for peasants due to his mother having been murdered by one despite trying to help them. His personal magic allows him to create, manipulate, and transform people into puppets.

The 2nd Fang of the Magia Lupus and Abel's best friend. Due to having the "Evil Eye" (a special ability which allows the user to temporarily nullify another's magic), Abyss has been feared and hated by society his entire life until he met Abel, leading him to be incredibly self-conscious about his eye and undyingly loyal to Abel. His personal magic allows him to conjure arrows that enable him to move at speeds which are too quick for the eye to catch.

The 3rd Fang of the Magia Lupus. Due to his father being a high-ranking member of the Bureau of Magic and his older brother being a Divine Visionary, Wirth is under a lot of pressure to rise higher in society. His personal magic allows him to manipulate mud.

The 5th Fang of the Magia Lupus. She is arrogant and believes that everyone exists to serve her. Her personal magic allows her to summon tornados.

The 6th Fang of the Magia Lupus. In spite of his unusual appearance, Olore is actually a very down-to-earth kind of guy. His personal magic allows him to create an underwater pocket dimension as well as transform himself into a shark.

Orca House

The house prefect and a double liner -- a line in the shape of a treble clef on the right side of her face, and a quarter note beneath her left eye. Initially presented as a tall buff man with a buzzcut, Margarette's true form—a petite girl with wavy hair—was revealed when her magic "metamorphosed" during her one-on-one against Mash in the second round of the Visionary exam. She is obsessed with tartar sauce and strong opponents, believing that "boredom is death". Her personal magic allows her to manipulate sound.

A student who was chosen by a Master Cane. His magic allows him to transfer damage to his enemies.

Divine Visionaries

The Light Cane and captain of the Magic Security Forces. He is very vain, considering himself the most handsome man and the greatest magic user, but is indeed incredibly skilled, kind and supportive towards citizens and anyone he deems "hot stuff", and serves as an ally to Mash. His personal magic allows him to manipulate incredibly fast and powerful beams of light, which can slice through anything.

The Desert Cane and a member of the Magical Power Administration. The elder brother of Wirth Mádl, 3rd Fang of Lang's Magia Lupus. He is cruel and ruthless, willing to resort to extreme measures to maintain the current world order, and plots to kill Mash. His personal magic allows him to manipulate sand, granting him incredible versatility in both offense and defense.

The Flame Cane and head of the Magic Talent Administration. Despite his cheeriness, Kaldo is harsh and cunning, yet has a fondness for honey and adds ludicrous amounts to anything he eats, even sashimi. His personal magic allows him to manipulate fire, and he wields a sword enchanted with black flames that eternally burn anything the blade touches.

The Immortal Cane and a member of the Magical Cemetery Administration. He is rather lazy, whiny, and forgetful, but is incredibly powerful, even among the Visionaries. He is currently incapacitated and being tortured after his fight with Doom. His personal magic allows him to summon undead body parts and renders him immortal, able to regenerate from any possible injury.

The Ice Cane and a member of the Magic Research Administration. She is timid, clumsy, and always cold. She is currently incapacitated and being tortured after her fight with Epidem. Her personal magic allows her to freeze anything, though she resents it and wishes her magic were something warm instead.

The Dragon Cane and a member of the Magical Creatures Administration. He is quiet and emotional, believing that life itself is inherently selfish, sinful, and painful, and suffers from an existential crisis as a result. He is currently incapacitated and being tortured after his fight with Famin. His personal magic allows him to control his pet dragon and transform it into a larger form.

The Knowledge Cane and a member of the Forbidden Magical Texts Administration. She is calm, polite, and logical. She is currently incapacitated and being tortured after her fight with Delisaster. Her personal magic allows her to manipulate the words, and consequently, the actions of her targets.

Innocent Zero

The leader of the criminal organization of the same name. He has the power to change his appearance, and usually takes the form of a featureless human. Seeking to become the ultimate human being, Innocent Zero has stolen countless magics and fathered six sons to sacrifice to complete an immortal body, with Mash being the youngest of them. His personal magic allows him to manipulate time.

A clone human created by Innocent Zero. He is cruel and sadistic, yet is easily wounded by dismissive or mean comments. His personal magic allows him to create and manipulate carbon, and by extension, diamonds.

The eldest son of Innocent Zero. He has a surprisingly noble personality. Doom enjoys battling and prefers not to fight weaker opponents, but follows Innocent Zero's every command, even if it pits him against weaker opponents. He wields a massive sword named Caladbolg, and is a Master Cane user who uses his magic power to boost his physical abilities to inhuman levels, surpassing even Mash's strength.

The second son of Innocent Zero. He is twisted, sadistic, selfish, and completely unpredictable; even Innocent Zero and his sons are wary of him. His personal magic allows him to turn things invisible. He applies this power to attack with a set of playing cards, which also collectively serve as his wand.

The third son of Innocent Zero. He has an incredible love for pudding, praising it with song, and falls into a demented rage when it is ruined. He has even formed an entire religion around it, called  Puddinology. He normally acts polite, but this hides his sadism. His personal magic allows him to create and manipulate orichalcum.

The fourth son of Innocent Zero. He is extremely laidback, narcissistic, and never takes anything seriously as a result of his incredible power and skill. He is also a heavy partier. His personal magic allows him to create and control guandao polearms.

Walkis Magic Academy
A top-three Magic School that believes that power is everything. It is assumed that the school is funded by Innocent Zero or a factor close to.

The top student at Walkis and Innocent Zero's fifth son. He seems calm and collected, but this is a façade to hide his immense anger, hatred, and rage, and he seeks to earn his father's approval. After Mash defeated him at full power, Innocent Zero arrived at the arena -- with his son, Doom and proceeded to fight until they sensed the presence of several visionaries. As a result, Innocent Zero unleashed magma on the spent Mash; after experiencing the first bit of genuine kindness from anyone, Domina sacrificed his life for Mash to escape. His personal magic allowed him to manipulate water in devastating ways, such as a water prison, high-pressure lasers, and turning into the water to avoid all damage. 

The Bureau of Magic Chief's son. He believes people's worth and power are decided by birth from their standing in society and is willing to commit any act to come out on top. This belief stems from Lévis' upbringing with his twin brother, who was superior to him but hid his talents so Lévis would no longer be the target of their father's abuse. He wears an eyepatch. He has two personal magics: one allows him to manipulate magnetism and create magnets of various shapes; the other allows him to manipulate electricity.

A student with a French accent and a severe mother complex, standing in contrast to Lance's sister complex. His personal magic allows him to create portals.

A tall boy with curly hair with bulging eyes and always has his tongue out. His personal magic allows him to manipulate acid.

Media

Manga
Shueisha has collected is chapters into individual tankōbon volumes. The first volume was released on June 4, 2020. As of February 3, 2023, fifteen volumes have been released.

The manga is digitally serialized by Viz Media and Manga Plus in English. In October 2020, Viz Media announced the print and digital publication of the manga and the first volume was published on July 6, 2021.

Volume list

Chapters not yet in tankōbon format
These chapters have yet to be published in a tankōbon volume. They were originally serialized in Weekly Shōnen Jump and its English digital version published by Viz Media and in Manga Plus by Shueisha.

Anime
An anime television series adaptation was announced in July 2022. The series is produced by A-1 Pictures and directed by Tomoya Tanaka, with scripts written by Yōsuke Kuroda, character designs by Hisashi Toshima, and music composed by Masaru Yokoyama. It is set to premiere on April 8, 2023, on Tokyo MX and other networks. According to the official website of the series, it will be a "complete" anime adaptation.

Aniplex of America revealed an English version of the announcement video at their Anime Expo panel on July 3, 2022. In February 2023, Crunchyroll announced that they will stream the series.

Reception
In June 2020, it was reported that the first volume of the series performed well enough to be sold out. By April 2021, the manga had over 1.4 million copies in circulation. By August 2021, the manga had over 2.1 million copies in circulation. By March 2022, the manga had over 3 million copies in circulation.

In 2020, the manga was nominated for the 6th Next Manga Awards and placed 11th out of the 50 nominees with 12,894 votes. The series ranked 3rd on the "Nationwide Bookstore Employees' Recommended Comics of 2021" by the Honya Club website. Mashle was nominated for the 67th Shogakukan Manga Award in the shōnen category in 2021.

The Nippon Foundation included the manga on their list of "5 Recommended Manga Available in English" and wrote: "[c]omic scenes of characters tormenting each other are fun to read, with no sense of distaste. In an amusing way, the story shows how cultivating special skills can overcome adversity." Writing for Le Figaro, Clémence Ballandras made a positive review about the series and wrote that it "combines the very specific universe of manga, with that of Harry Potter, while infusing a good dose of humor." Rebecca Silverman of Anime News Network gave the first volume a B+. Silverman praised the series for its humor, calling it a "Harry Potter parody with overtones of One-Punch Man." Silverman, however, wrote that apart from Mash, the rest of characters are "forgettable" and said that the art is "fairly unattractive", comparing it to Mob Psycho 100. Nevertheless, she concluded: "[it]t doesn't look pretty, but it also doesn't need to, making this a good addition to the library of humor manga." 

Sheena McNeil of Sequential Tart gave the first volume a 7 out of 10. McNeil also noted the similarities with One-Punch Man and Harry Potter, praising as well its story and art, concluding: "I enjoyed this read a fair amount. It's low key hilarious. It has flaws, but it also has potential, and I look forward to where it goes from here." In a review of the second volume, McNeil gave it a 8, and wrote: "[i]f you want action, humor, and magic, this story hits you over the head with all three."

References

External links
 

 

2023 anime television series debuts
A-1 Pictures
Adventure anime and manga
Anime series based on manga
Aniplex
Comedy anime and manga
Fantasy anime and manga
Shōnen manga
Shueisha manga
Television shows written by Yōsuke Kuroda
Viz Media manga